Al-Nafal, pronounced as an-Nafal, is a subject of Baladiyah al-Shemal and a residential neighborhood in northern Riyadh, Saudi Arabia. Spanned across 3.96 square kilometers, it is bordered by Northern Ring Road to the south whereas shares proximity with al-Ghadir neighborhood to the west and al-Wadi neighborhood to the east.

References 

Neighbourhoods in Riyadh